Wavves is the debut studio album by the American band Wavves. It was originally released on cassette format before being re-released on LP/CD formats.

Track listing

References

2008 debut albums
Wavves albums
Woodsist albums